The members of the eighteenth National Assembly of South Korea were elected on 9 April 2008. The Assembly sat from 30 May 2008 until 29 May 2012.

Members

References

018
National Assembly members 018